Stefania schuberti is a species of frog in the family Hemiphractidae.
Its natural habitats are subtropical or tropical moist montane forests and rivers.

This species is endemic to the summit of Auyan-tepui, Venezuela.

See also
 Stefania

References

Stefania
Amphibians of Venezuela
Endemic fauna of Venezuela
Taxonomy articles created by Polbot
Amphibians described in 1997
Amphibians of the Tepuis